Durham Memorial A.M.E. Zion Church, formerly known as St. Luke's A.M.E. Zion Church until the late 1950s, is a historic African Methodist Episcopal Zion Church located at Buffalo in Erie County, New York.  It is a brick church constructed in 1920.  It is the oldest surviving church associated with the Buffalo A.M.E. Zion congregations.

It was listed on the National Register of Historic Places in 1983.

References

External links
 Durham Memorial A.M.E. Zion Church- Buffalo, NY website

Churches on the National Register of Historic Places in New York (state)
African-American history in Buffalo, New York
Churches completed in 1845
19th-century Methodist church buildings in the United States
Churches in Buffalo, New York
National Register of Historic Places in Buffalo, New York